Chebucto Grays was a volunteer rifle battalion that was raised in Halifax, Nova Scotia. In the wake of the Crimean War (1853–1856), there developed a Volunteer Force in Britain. As part of this movement, in Nova Scotia, thirty-two Volunteer companies were raised in Nova Scotia, with a total strength of two thousand three hundred and forty-one.  In Halifax there were eleven companies with a total strength of eight hundred and sixty-eight men. The Chebucto Grays was the most distinguished battalion, many of the members belonging to The Halifax Club.  The Chebucto Grays were one of 8 Regiments to serve in the Halifax Volunteer Battalion.

Notable members 
George Lang
Brenton Halliburton
William Blowers Bliss
Enos Collins
James William Johnston
Mather Byles Almon
John Fitzwilliam Stairs
Samuel Leonard Shannon
James Forman (merchant)
William Young (Nova Scotia politician)
Philip Carteret Hill
John William Ritchie

Gallery

See also 
Victoria Rifles (Nova Scotia)
 Halifax Volunteer Battalion

References 

History of Nova Scotia
Military regiments raised in Nova Scotia
Infantry units and formations of Canada